The Twisted Ones is a 2019 horror novel written by Ursula Vernon, under the penname of T. Kingfisher. It was published in the United States and United Kingdom in 2019 through Gallery/Saga Press.

Vernon drew inspiration for The Twisted Ones from Arthur Machen’s short horror story “The White People” and the novel is a contemporary take on the story.

Synopsis
Mouse is a 30-something book editor. Her cruel and nasty grandmother has died, and Mouse travels to North Carolina to clear out her home. Mouse's step-grandfather, Frederick Cotgrave, died some years earlier. Mouse discovers his diary, in which he documents his obsession with something called "The Green Book", his contentious relationship with his wife, and his own descent into madness. Mouse also finds Frederick's version of "The Green Book", typed from memory.

Already unnerved by the isolation of the house in the woods, Mouse is terrified to discover twisted versions of deer roaming about at night. When her dog, Bongo, leads her into the realm of the "twisted ones", Mouse barely escapes with her sanity intact. Bongo goes missing, and reappears days later with a message begging for help.

With the help of neighbor Roxy, a brassy, 60-something ex-hippie who lives across the road, Mouse re-enters the realm of the "twisted ones" to try to rescue whoever is trapped there. Captured by legions of "twisted ones", they encounter Anna, a woman who has been trapped in the realm of magic since the late 1960s. The race of beings which created the automatons called "twisted ones" have long died out, and the "twisted ones" have been breeding Anna and a very old man named Uriah to try to recreate them. This has failed, and now Anna has lured Mouse into the realm so she can be freed and Mouse can take her place.

Anna agrees to escape with Mouse and Roxy's help, killing Uriah to delay the "twisted ones". Roxy's foresight in bringing a gun helps Mouse escape when Anna betrays them at the last moment. When a "twisted one" attacks the two of them back at the grandmother's home, they burn the house down to escape.

Release
The Twisted Ones was published in hardback format in the United States and United Kingdom through Gallery/Saga Press in October 2019. A paperback edition was also released in the United States alongside the hardback edition; Titan Books released a paperback edition in the United Kingdom in March 2020.

An audiobook adaptation narrated by Hillary Huber was released via Simon & Schuster Audio in October 2019.

Reception 
Critical reception for The Twisted Ones has been generally positive. Common praise for the novel centered upon the character of Mouse and the book's atmosphere and tension, with Starburst writing that "Like the best occult fiction, the novel’s building sense of unease comes from the unexpected, the incongruous and the unexplained." Other elements of praise included what the Chicago Review of Books called a "rich, regional narrative voice". The British Fantasy Society's Sarah Deeming commented that "knowing that Mouse would be OK lost a bit of the tension", as this was detailed in the beginning of the book, but that "As an atmospheric, creepy read, The Twisted Ones has some great moments."

Awards

References

Simon & Schuster books
Southern Gothic novels
Works by Ursula Vernon
Saga Press books